Gagea lutea, known as the yellow star-of-Bethlehem, is a Eurasian flowering plant species in the family Liliaceae. It is widespread in central Europe with scattered populations in Great Britain, Spain, and Norway to Siberia and Japan.<ref name=powo>{{cite web|title=Gagea (L.) Ker Gawl. |work=Plants of the World Online | url=https://powo.science.kew.org/taxon/urn:lsid:ipni.org:names:535577-1 |publisher=Royal Botanic  Gardens, Kew|access-date=19 March 2023}}</ref>Gagea lutea'' is a bulb-forming herbaceous perennial with lanceolate leaves and yellow flowers with 6 tepals. It is a predominantly lowland species that inhabits moist, base-rich, shady habitats including; broad-leaf woodlands, hedgerows, limestone pavements, pastures, and riverbanks. It has been used as an indicator of ancient woodland in East Anglia.

References

External links
Flowers of India
Botany Czech
Tela Botanica
NatureGate Promotions Finland 

lutea
Flora of Europe
Flora of Asia
Plants described in 1753
Taxa named by Carl Linnaeus